Magic Ajji ( Magic Grandma) is a 2005 Indian Kannada language fantasy film directed by Dinesh Baboo.  It was the first digital film shot in high-definition in Kannada, and the second to be released. The first being Baboo's 2004 Kanakambari. Magic Ajji stars Khushbu Sundar as Queen Rajeshwari Devi, the grandmother and ghost, Master Tejas (Thejas Kesari) as grandson Arjun, and Sudha Rani as Arjun's mother Nirmala Devi. Other characters are played by Ramesh Bhat, Mandya Ramesh, Chi. Guru Dutt, Chitra Shenoy, Shivaram, Pruthviraj and Karibasavaiah. Ganesh plays a cameo. The movie won critical acclaim for its family entertainment quotient, unprecedented use of special effects and animation, and for the performances on Khushbu and Thejas Kesari.

Plot 
Magic Ajji deals with a royal family under Queen Rajeshwari Devi (Khushbu Sundar). One of the sons in the family marries a woman belonging to a lower caste (Sudha Rani), and is disowned by the family. After his premature death, the other family members keep the wife and the son Arjun (Thejas) away from the palace. The queen dies on the night of her 100th birthday. She then comes back in the form of a friendly ghost to help Arjun and his mother claim their rightful place in the palace. This is the tale of an old woman who controls the affairs of a royal palace who is visible to her grandson after her death and helps him in his distress.

Cast 
 Khushbu Sundar as Queen Rajeshwari Devi, Ajji (voice dubbed by Girija Lokesh)
 Thejas Kesari as Arjun
 Sudha Rani as Nirmala Devi, Arjun's Mother
 Ramesh Bhat as Queen's grandson-in-law
 Chitra Shenoy as Queen's granddaughter
 Chi. Guru Datt as Queen's grandson-in-law
 Pooja Lokesh as Queen's granddaughter
 Mandya Ramesh as Queen's grandson-in-law
 Roopa Iyer as Queen's granddaughter
 Pruthvi Raj as Venkatachalayya, Queen's Advocate
 Ganesh as Venkatachalayya's subordinate	
 Karibasavaiah as an exorcist
 Shivaram as Royal Priest

Production 
Reports that Khushbu Sundar would play the role of a 100-year-old grandmother in Magic Ajji emerged in July 2003. When asked how she came to accept the role of a grandmother, she stated: "the role matters to me the most. As long as I get a prominent role, I don't mind playing any role including that of a grandmother." She added, "I have everything going for me in this film. I basically play the grandmother, but thanks to the director's imagination running wild, I also transform into a village belle and an air hostess in certain parts of the film. But I am not playing a witch, mind you! Basically, Magic Ajji will be a fun film for the children."

Reception 
P. K. Hariyabbe, the reviewer for Deccan Herald, called the film "highly interesting, not just for its simple plot, but for the special effects." They felt "Khushboo as the Ajji, is a revelation" and added, "Master Tejas as Arjuna Krishna does a great job. The supporting cast chips in efficiently to make this film an entertainer."

See also
Cinema of Karnataka

References

2005 films
2000s Kannada-language films
Indian children's fantasy films
Films directed by Dinesh Baboo